Sebastián Nicolás Flores Stefanovich (born 9 September 1983) is a Uruguayan footballer. He currently plays for Central Español.

Career
Sebastian Flores began his career at C.A. Peñarol, a club known for its long time history and success in Uruguay. He later went on to incorporate himself in C.A. Bella Vista, a team that had been regulated to the First Division of the Uruguay League. It was at that point he declared himself a professional footballer in 2002. Three years later he would achieve the "Apertura" championship of the Second Division in June 2005 as well as the Uruguayan Championship which allowed the team to be promoted back into the First Division.

As a result of the fantastic campaign, Sebastian Flores would be transferred to Salernitana Calcio, of the Italian League.

He would later sign with Aris Thessaloniki F.C., a club in which he would also obtain a promotion to the First Division of the Greek national league, which later also classified to the prestigious UEFA Cup. After going through the Greek League, Sebastian would signed with CD Cobena which reached the Second Division of the Spanish soccer league.

Flores would finally sign with the Club Cherno More Varna, which competes in the competitive First Division of the Bulgarian Soccer League. In June 2009, Sebastian assisted the club in their classification towards the UEFA Cup as well as achieving the Bronze title in the Bulgarian League. After a season with Cherno More, he signed with Botev Plovdiv, a team in the First Division of the Bulgarian Soccer League.

In 2011 and after a long passage through European football, Flores returned to Uruguay to play in the CA Rentistas team from the first division of Uruguay. In September 2012 and after finishing the contract with CA Rentistas, he signed with CA Torque professional football team from Uruguay, intentions team in its first year as a professional, search a promotion to first division. They loss by penalty definition the final for promotion. After good season with four scores, the captain of CA Torque signed a contract with Huracan FC.

In 2016 he was transferred to Rampla Jr FC and after a season was champion of the Apertura championship second division and Uruguayan champion. Just losing a single game of all disputed and returning an Historic Rampla to the Privilege Divisional. After so many achievements he was called and seduce by a great institutional project of the Central Español FC. That in less than a year and a half, almost achieved consecrating, with an advantage of ten points over the second and defence with fewer goals against, but was delayed by an injury.

Professional achievements
 Championship Apertura of the Second Division 2005 CA Bella Vista 
 Championship Uruguayo of the Second Division 2005 CA Bella Vista
 Promotion to Uruguayan  Serie A CA Bella Vista
 Promotion to the First Division of the Greek national league  to Aris Thessalonik 2006
 Classification to UEFA Cup with Aris Thesaloniki 2007
 Bronze title of the Bulgarian League with Cherno More 2009 
 Classification to UEFA Cup 2009
 Championship Apertura of the Second Division 2016 Rampla Junior 
 Championship Uruguayo of the Second Division 2016 Rampla Junior FC
 Promotion to Uruguayan  Serie A Rampla Junior FC

Personal life
In September 2005, Flores received Italian citizenship.

Management

External links
 Profile at footballmercato.com
 Profile at www.tenfieldigital.com.uy/Rentistas
 Profile at sebastianflores.com
 Profile at www.spox.com
 Profile at www.calciomercato.com

1983 births
Living people
Uruguayan footballers
Association football defenders
C.A. Bella Vista players
People from Canelones Department
Expatriate footballers in Greece
Aris Thessaloniki F.C. players
Expatriate footballers in Spain
Expatriate footballers in Bulgaria
PFC Cherno More Varna players
Botev Plovdiv players
Uruguayan people of Italian descent
First Professional Football League (Bulgaria) players
Uruguayan expatriates in Bulgaria